Palaiokomi is a village in the municipality of Amphipolis in the regional unit of Serres. It is the second largest village of the municipality of Amphipolis in terms of population (1,293 inhabitants), after Rodolivos.

See also
List of settlements in the Serres regional unit

References

Populated places in Serres (regional unit)